Nikola Kicev (born April 6, 1998) is a Macedonian professional basketball Shooting guard who currently plays for EuroNickel 2005 in the Macedonian First League.

References

External links
 
 http://www.fibaeurope.com/compID_YUjW-7-FJ,kK9s431Lyr41.season_2014.roundID_10106.teamID_2604.playerID_116191.html

1998 births
Living people
Sportspeople from Kavadarci
Macedonian men's basketball players
Shooting guards